Biran is a village in Tosham tehsil of Bhiwani district in the Indian state of Haryana.

Demographics
, Biran had a population of 5,088 living in 1007 households. Males (2,676) constitute  more than 52.59%  of the population and females (2,412) 47.4%. Biran had a total of 3,433 literates giving an average literacy rate of 67.47%, which is lower than the national average of 74%. Male literacy was 60.58% (2080), and female literacy 39.41% (1,353). In Biran, 10.96% or 558 individuals were under six years of age .

References

Villages in Bhiwani district